The Eurovision Dance Contest 2007 was the inaugural edition of the Eurovision Dance Contest, a dance competition co-production between the European Broadcasting Union (EBU) and host broadcaster BBC. The first ever pan-European dance competition was held on 1 September 2007 in London, United Kingdom with the participation of 16 countries.

Viewers cast their votes by telephone and SMS text message voting on each couple's two dances – the first being ballroom or Latin with the second being freestyle, with a "national" flavour. Professional dance couples were allowed to enter the competition. Comedian Graham Norton and Claudia Winkleman presented the 2007 contest from the BBC Television Centre in London. Enrique Iglesias performed a medley of "Tired of Being Sorry" and "Do You Know? (The Ping Pong Song)" during the interval.

The first ever winners of the contest were Katja Koukkula and Jussi Väänänen of Finland who received a total of 132 points. 2nd place went to Ukraine, 3rd to Ireland, 4th to Poland and 5th place to Austria following a tie with Portugal, who also received 74 points.

Location 

Alongside the announcement as host broadcaster, the host city, venue and presenters for the contest were announced by the BBC on 13 April 2007.

The host venue was the BBC Television Centre, White City, London, which opened in 1960. It is one of the most readily recognisable facilities of its type having appeared as the backdrop for many BBC programmes. It remained to be one of the largest such facilities in the world until it closed in March 2013. In September 2017, BBC Studioworks re-opened the three studios at Television Centre, alongside a range of post-production facilities and ancillary areas.

Television Centre previously hosted the Eurovision Song Contest 1963 after , which won the year before, declined to host it due to financial shortcomings, also having hosted the competition in  and . The last time the United Kingdom hosted one of the Eurovision's network Family of Events was the Eurovision Young Dancers 2001, which was also held in London.

Format

Host broadcaster
The contest was hosted by the BBC, and was a co-production by Splash Media – run by the developers of its successful Strictly Come Dancing format – and sports production house Sunset + Vine – with help from the International DanceSport Federation and in association with the European Broadcasting Union.

The contest was broadcast in English and French languages, although France did not take part. Each broadcaster also had the option of providing its own commentators at the event.

Visual design
The logo of 2007 Contest features the word Eurovision written in the same way as it is on the Eurovision Song Contest logos without the heart but included the silhouette of a dancing couple in front of a star that contains the flag of the host country, the United Kingdom.

Running order
The running order for the 16 participants was announced on 6 August 2007 and had been determined in two steps. In the first round, the participating countries were drawn into groups, under supervision of an auditor. In the second round, the producers of the contest determined the final running order within the drawn groups to assure variety in the live show.

Interval act

Singer Enrique Iglesias, son of  Julio Iglesias, performed a medley of "Tired of Being Sorry" and "Do You Know? (The Ping Pong Song)" as the interval act. The performance was pre-recorded before the live show.

Participants
On 18 January 2007, the EBU officially announced the creation of this new dance contest. At the time, fourteen countries had already expressed their interest in taking part, with a production meeting taking place the day before in London. On 13 April, BBC News Online incorrectly reported that thirteen countries would compete in the upcoming inaugural contest that autumn; these being Austria, Denmark, Finland, Germany, Ireland, Netherlands, Portugal, Russia, Spain, Sweden, Switzerland, Ukraine and United Kingdom. Greece, Lithuania and Poland were not included in the list despite being confirmed as participants. The Croatian broadcaster HRT was one of the 14 countries that had initially expressed an interest in taking part (alongside Ukraine), but pulled out due to costs and scheduling problems.

Due to the forest fires in Greece, the Greek national broadcaster ERT did not air the show live and therefore used a back-up jury instead of televoting.

Austria and Portugal both finished with the same number of points, however, Austria received points from every other participating nation thus receiving points from more countries than Portugal, hence Austria took 5th place.

Scoreboard

The following 16 countries took part, and received the scores shown below.

12 points 
Below is a summary of all 12 points in the contest:

Spokespersons 
The order in which each country announced their votes was done in order of performance. The spokespersons are shown alongside each country. 

 
 
 Marcus van Teijlingen
 Kirsty Gallacher
 
 Alice and Ellen Kessler
 George Amyras
 
 
 Pamela Flood
 
 
 
 Svetoslav Vlokh

Broadcasts 
Most countries sent commentators to London or commentated from their own country, in order to add insight to the participants and, if necessary, provide voting information. Among the countries that took part, Albania, Armenia, Belarus, Bosnia and Herzegovina, Cyprus, Iceland, Israel and Macedonia also broadcast the event without sending representatives.

Viewing figures

See also
 Eurovision Song Contest 2007
 Junior Eurovision Song Contest 2007

References

External links 
Official Eurovision Dance Contest website
EBU Press Release

2007 in London
Eurovision Dance Contest by year
2007 in Europe
2007 competitions
Events in London
September 2007 events in Europe